Alle meine Töchter (All My Daughters) was a German drama television series which aired on ZDF between 1995 and 2001. it is based on a widowed judge Berthold Sanwaldt (Günter Mack), who lives with his three daughters, Anna, Sylvie, and youngest, Patty, in a Munich villa. 76 episodes were produced and a long sequence.

See also
List of German television series

External links
 

German drama television series
1995 German television series debuts
2001 German television series endings
ZDF original programming
German-language television shows